Deltophora flavocincta is a moth of the family Gelechiidae. It is found in Mexico (Tamaulipas, Tabasco) and Colombia (Magdalena).

The length of the forewings is 5–6 mm. The forewings are ochreous, with black markings. Adults have been recorded on wing in February and from June to August at altitudes between 300 and 600 meters.

References

Moths described in 1979
Deltophora
Taxa named by Klaus Sattler